Robina Hospital is a large public hospital servicing the southern suburbs of the Gold Coast, Queensland, Australia. Located in the Robina CBD, it is a teaching hospital for Bond University and Griffith University.

Location 
The Robina Hospital is located at 2 Bayberry Lane in the suburb of Robina. Pacific Motorway (M1) exit 79 is only a short drive from the hospital entrance. A multi-story car park for visitors and patients is provided.

Public transport 
Located adjacent to the hospital is the Robina Railway Station, providing train and bus connections. Trains run typically every 30 minutes, travelling to the northern suburbs of the city as well as to Brisbane. Surfside Buslines run services to the surrounding suburbs.

History 
Robina Hospital was originally built as a private hospital in 2000, offering some public services. In 2002, the Queensland Government purchased the hospital.

The $42 million Stage One Hospital expansion was completed in September 2007 delivering 25 beds and a new emergency department, intensive care and coronary care unit, expanded renal services and increased pathology, radiology, pharmacy, and medical records departments.

The $287.7 million Stage Two and Three expansion delivered an extra 154 new beds transforming it into a 364-bed teaching hospital. Baulderstone was awarded the expansion project which included major new works, construction in two of the hospital wings and refurbishment of the existing hospital building. The main works were completed in late 2010 and completion of refurbishment works in early 2012.

Notable Staff 

Ranadi Vincent (SHO)

References

External links
 Queensland Government Robina Hospital Expansion Project
 Gold Coast Health - Robina Hospital
 Translink - Public Transport information

Hospital buildings completed in 2000
Teaching hospitals in Australia
Hospitals in Queensland
Buildings and structures on the Gold Coast, Queensland
Robina, Queensland
2000 establishments in Australia